José Manuel Valades (born: 15 July 1953) is a sailor from Spain. who represented his country at the 1988 Summer Olympics in Busan, South Korea as crew member in the Soling. With helmsman Antonio Gorostegui and fellow crew members Jaime Monjo and Domingo Manrique they took the 17th place. Valades was due to illness replaced by Manrique after the first race.

References

Living people
1953 births
Sailors at the 1988 Summer Olympics – Soling
Olympic sailors of Spain
Spanish male sailors (sport)